New Game! is a Japanese four-panel manga series by Shōtarō Tokunō, which was serialized in Houbunsha's seinen manga magazine Manga Time Kirara Carat from January 2013 to August 2021 and is licensed in English by Seven Seas Entertainment. An anime television series adaptation by Doga Kobo aired in Japan between July and September 2016, with a second season airing between July and September 2017. A video game developed by 5pb. was released in January 2017.

Plot
Having been inspired by the character designs of a particular video game when she was younger, Aoba Suzukaze, a high school graduate, begins working as a character designer for the video game's developer, Eagle Jump. As she works on modelling and designing characters for video games in development, she becomes acquainted with her female colleagues in the character design department, as well as those from within the company.

Characters

A twintailed high school graduate who joins the Eagle Jump video game company as a character designer, as they made her favorite game. Due to her small stature, she is often mistaken for a middle school student.

The lead character designer of Eagle Jump. She spends a lot of time at the office, often sleeping there overnight in her panties, and has a laid-back but stern attitude. She was the character designer for the game that inspired Aoba to become one herself. After two years pass in the story, she goes to work at the Blue Rose video game company in France alongside Christina's sister Catarine.

An art director and head of the background department. She is close friends with Ko and is implied to have feelings for her; thus, she tends to get jealous when others get close to her. Unlike Ko, she is organized, well maintained and also a bit shy. In the final chapter she is seen with a ring and it's confirmed she married Ko.

A character designer. She is shy talking to others and prefers to speak via e-mail. She has a pet hedgehog named Sojiro and secretly enjoys cosplay.

A motion designer who works in the character design department as there are no open seats in the animation department. She later takes on the additional role of game planner. She enjoys sentai shows and owns various prop weapons.

A character designer who designs monsters and often dresses in gothic clothing. She speaks with an  Osaka dialect and has two younger siblings.

Aoba's friend from high school who is currently in university. After working a summer job as a playtester for Eagle Jump, she takes an interest in designing games herself and soon joins the company as a programmer in Umiko's department.

A programmer who often gets annoyed when she has to fix errors and is embarrassed by her surname. She is a military fan and has several airsoft guns in her workspace.

A game director with a strong interest in cute girls, hence why her department is entirely female. She is often told off by Umiko for sneaking from her workstation and making impulsive changes to the game design. She owns a cat named Mozuku.

A half-French producer who works at Eagle Jump's publishing company, Houbundo. Although often having a strict appearance, she is shy around others. Her sister Catarine works at the Blue Rose video game company in France.

A girl who joins Eagle Jump as a graphic artist during the story's second year. She lives with Tsubame, who calls her "Momo" for short, and considers Aoba to be her rival.

A girl who joins Eagle Jump as a programmer during the story's second year, nicknamed "Naru". Her family owns an inn in Hokkaido, and they initially disapproved of her decision to enter the game industry.

Aoba and Nene's friend from high school, who was part of their school's Art Club. She is a skilled artist but has a weak condition. She is currently studying at a fine arts college in order to become a professional illustrator. She also studied in France for a time.

A teacher in Aoba and Nene's high school, who is good friends with Hotaru. Despite being an advisor for the Art Club, she has no drawing skills of her own and often prefers to play baseball.

Christina's sister who works at the Blue Rose video game company in France.

Christina and Catarine's younger sister, who lives with Catarine in France.

Media

Manga
The original manga by Shōtarō Tokunō began serialization in Houbunsha's Manga Time Kirara Carat magazine from January 28, 2013. Houbunsha has published thirteen tankōbon volumes since February 27, 2014. The fifth volume, subtitled The Spinoff!, takes place prior to the main series and features content not included in the magazine serialization. Seven Seas Entertainment licensed the series in North America. Three comic anthologies were released from August 2016 to August 2017. The series ended in Manga Time Kirara Carat October 2021 issue on August 27, 2021.

Anime

A 12-episode anime television series adaptation aired in Japan between July 4 and September 19, 2016 and was simulcast by Crunchyroll. The anime is produced by Doga Kobo, with Yoshiyuki Fujiwara as the director and Fumihiko Shimo as the series' script supervisor, featuring character designs by Ai Kikuchi. An original video animation (OVA) episode was made available for those who purchased all six Blu-ray/DVD volumes of the series, released between September 28, 2016 and February 24, 2017. A second season titled New Game!! (stylized as NEW GAME!!) was announced in February 2017, and aired in Japan between July 11 and September 26, 2017 and was simulcast by Crunchyroll. The series is licensed in North America by Crunchyroll, and Funimation dubbed and released it on home video. Muse Communication licensed the series in Asia-Pacific and started streaming it on Muse Asia YouTube channel.

Video games
A visual novel developed by 5pb., titled New Game!: The Challenge Stage, was released for PlayStation 4 and PlayStation Vita in Japan on January 26, 2017. Characters from the series also appear alongside other Manga Time Kirara characters in the 2017 mobile role-playing game Kirara Fantasia.

References

External links
 Anime official website 
 

Mages (company)
Anime series based on manga
Comedy anime and manga
Crunchyroll anime
Doga Kobo
Funimation
Houbunsha manga
Japan-exclusive video games
Kadokawa Dwango franchises
Mainichi Broadcasting System original programming
Muse Communication
PlayStation 4 games
PlayStation Vita games
Seinen manga
Seven Seas Entertainment titles
Television shows about video games
Tokyo MX original programming
2017 video games
Video games based on anime and manga
Video games developed in Japan
Visual novels
Works about video games
Yonkoma